Kernouës is a commune in the Finistère department of Brittany in northwestern France.

Population
Inhabitants of Kernouës are called in French Kernouésiens.

See also
Communes of the Finistère department

References

External links
Mayors of Finistère Association 

Communes of Finistère